The Antigo Opera House is a historic opera house and concert hall in Antigo, Wisconsin, United States. The brick building was built in 1904 by architect J.H. Jeffers in the Classical Revival style. The opera house could seat 1100 people. In addition to its use for entertainment, the building served as an armory during World War I and is now an apartment building. The opera house was added to the National Register of Historic Places on January 12, 1984.

References

Theatres completed in 1904
Buildings and structures in Langlade County, Wisconsin
Neoclassical architecture in Wisconsin
Opera houses in Wisconsin
Music venues completed in 1904
National Register of Historic Places in Langlade County, Wisconsin
Opera houses on the National Register of Historic Places in Wisconsin
1904 establishments in Wisconsin